The 2020–21 Preston North End F.C. season was the club's 141st season in existence and their sixth consecutive season in the Championship. They also took part in the FA Cup and the EFL Cup. The season covers the period from July 2020 to 30 June 2021.

Squad

 All appearances and goals up to date as of 8 May 2021.

Statistics

|-
!colspan=14|Players out on loan:

|-
!colspan=14|Players who left the club:

|}

Goals record

Disciplinary record

Transfers

Transfers in

Loans in

Loans out

Transfers out

Kevin O’Connor

Pre-season and friendlies

Competitions

Overview

Championship

League table

Results summary

Results by matchday

Matches
The 2020–21 season fixtures were released on 21 August.

FA Cup

The third round draw was made on 30th November, with Premier League and EFL Championship clubs all entering the competition.

EFL Cup

The first round draw was made on 18 August, live on Sky Sports, by Paul Merson. The draw for both the second and third round were confirmed on September 6, live on Sky Sports by Phil Babb.

Notes

References

External links

Preston North End F.C. seasons
Preston North End F.C.